Adrian Schiller (born 21 February 1964) is an English actor.

Selected filmography
The Hour We Knew Nothing of Each Other (2008, theatre performance)
Terry Pratchett's Going Postal (2010) (cast as the Banshee, Mr Gryle)
Being Human (Season 2, 2010)
A Touch of Frost
A Little Chaos (2014)
Son of God (2014)
The Danish Girl (2015)
Suffragette (2015)
Beauty and the Beast (2017)
Doctor Who (2011, episode "The Doctor's Wife")
The Mercy (2017)
Victoria (2016-2017)
The Last Kingdom (2018-2022)
Censor (2021) : Frederik North      
He also played Charlie Highbank in an episode of the Morse prequel Endeavour titled "Sway" (in series 4, 2014).

Schiller is the face on the anti-drink-driving PIF Moment of Doubt on British TV, part of the DfT's 'Think! Road Safety' campaign since 2007. In December 2008 the advert won Best Casting at the BTACA awards.

In 2021 he played Pasha Verdinikov in two episodes of Death in Paradise.

References

External links

1964 births
Living people
20th-century British male actors
21st-century British male actors
British male film actors
British male stage actors
British male television actors
Male actors from Cornwall
Male actors from London